Ugol is a rural locality (a village) in Bogorodskoye Rural Settlement, Ust-Kubinsky District, Vologda Oblast, Russia. The population was 19 as of 2002.

Geography 
Ugol is located 68 km northwest of Ustye (the district's administrative centre) by road. Senskaya is the nearest rural locality.

References 

Rural localities in Ust-Kubinsky District